The Murano Glass Museum (Italian: Museo del Vetro) is a museum on the history of glass, including local Murano glass, located on the island of Murano, just north of Venice, Italy.

History
The museum was founded in 1861. It was originally built in the Gothic style as a patrician's palace. The building became the residence of Bishop Marco Giustinian in 1659. He later bought it and donated it to the Torcello diocese. In 1805, the Torcello diocese was closed. In 1840, the palace was sold to the Murano Municipality, who would use it as a town hall, museum, and archives. In 1923, when the Murano Municipality joined Venice, the museum came under the management of the Fondazione Musei Civici di Venezia (MUVE), its current operator.

Location
It is located close to the "Museo" vaporetto water bus stop.

Collection
The collection of the museum, one of the most complete in the world, ranges from antiquity to 20th century works including realizations by the famous Barovier & Toso glass company and glass textiles designed by Carlo Scarpa in the late thirties.

See also 
 History of glass
 Murano glass
 MUVE
 Paolo Venini

References

External links 

 

Art museums established in 1861
Glass museums and galleries
Art museums and galleries in Venice
Venetian glass
House of Giustiniani
1861 establishments in Italy
Glass Museum